Ann Mimmi Ellenore Larsson (born 9 April 1994) is a Swedish football forward who plays for the Kansas City Current and the Sweden national team.

International goals

References

External links 
 
 
 
 

1994 births
Living people
Swedish women's footballers
Mallbackens IF players
Eskilstuna United DFF players
Damallsvenskan players
Women's association football forwards
2019 FIFA Women's World Cup players
Sweden women's international footballers
Linköpings FC players
UEFA Women's Euro 2017 players